The 2018–19 season was Hajer's third consecutive season in the Prince Mohammad bin Salman League following their relegation from the Professional League during the 2015–16 season, it was also their 68th year in existence. Along with competing in the MS League, the club also participated in the King Cup. The season covers the period from 1 July 2018 to 30 June 2019.

First-team squad

Transfers

In

Out

Pre-season friendlies

Competitions

Prince Mohammad bin Salman League

League table

Results summary

Results by matchday

Matches
All times are local, AST (UTC+3).

King Cup

All times are local, AST (UTC+3).

Statistics

Appearances and Goals

Last updated on 15 May 2019.

|-
! colspan=14 style=background:#dcdcdc; text-align:center|Goalkeepers

|-
! colspan=14 style=background:#dcdcdc; text-align:center|Defenders

|-
! colspan=14 style=background:#dcdcdc; text-align:center|Midfielders

|-
! colspan=14 style=background:#dcdcdc; text-align:center|Forwards

|-
! colspan=14 style=background:#dcdcdc; text-align:center| Player who made an appearance this season but have left the club

|-
|}

Goalscorers
Last updated on 15 May 2019.

Clean sheets
Last updated on 20 March 2019.

References

Hajer Club seasons
Hajer